Anthene scintillula, the golden ciliate blue, is a butterfly in the family Lycaenidae. It is found in Sierra Leone, Ivory Coast, Ghana, Nigeria, Cameroon, Equatorial Guinea, Gabon, the Republic of the Congo, the Central African Republic, the Democratic Republic of the Congo and Uganda. The habitat consists of forests.

Subspecies
Anthene scintillula scintillula (eastern Nigeria, Cameroon, Equatorial Guinea, Gabon, Congo, Central African Republic, western Uganda, Democratic Republic of the Congo: Mongala, Uele, Tshopo, Equateur, Sankuru and Maniema)
Anthene scintillula aurea (Bethune-Baker, 1910) (Sierra Leone, Ivory Coast, Ghana, western Nigeria)

References

Butterflies described in 1891
Anthene
Butterflies of Africa